María P. Neira (born 1962) is a Spanish physician, international civil servant and diplomat, who has since 2005, served as the Director of the Public Health, Environment and Social Determinants of Health Department (PHE) of the World Health Organization (WHO).

Biography 
María P. Neira studied medicine and surgery at the University of Oviedo in Asturias, Spain. She specialised in endocrinology and metabolic diseases at the Université René Déscartes in Paris, France. She earned a master's degree in public health and a diploma in human nutrition from the Université Pierre et Marie Curie, in Paris, France. Neira went on to receive the international diploma in Emergency Preparedness and Crisis Management granted by the University of Geneva in Switzerland.

In her early career, Neira was the medical coordinator with Médecins Sans Frontières (Doctors without Borders) in refugee camps in Salvador and Honduras during the armed conflict and the period of instability. She was the Vice Minister of Health and Consumer Affairs in Spain from 2002 and 2005. She also served as President of the Spanish Food Safety and Nutrition Agency. For five years, she was the Public Health Adviser in the Ministry of Health in Maputo and Mozambique. She was the UN Public Health Advisor/Physician for the United Nations Development Programme (UNDP) in Kigali, Rwanda.

Maria Neira joined the WHO in 1993 as the Coordinator of the Global Task Force on Cholera Control. In 1999, she was the Director of the Department of Control, Prevention and Eradication. She was appointed the Director of the Department of Public Health and Environment at the World Health Organization (WHO) in 2005.

In November 2019 Maria Neira joined the High Level Advisory Board of the Lancet Countdown: Tracking Progress on Health and Climate Change.

Honours and awards 

 Médaille de l'Ordre du Mérite National by the Government of France
 Spanish National Nutrition Strategy Award
 Mujer Extraordinaria Award by Queen Letizia of Spain,
 Member of the Royal Academy of Medicine of Asturias
 “Inspirational women working towards protecting the environment,” International Women's Day Celebration in Geneva, by UNEP (2016)

References 

1962 births
21st-century diplomats
21st-century civil servants
Living people
Paris Descartes University alumni
Pierre and Marie Curie University alumni
Spanish diplomats
Spanish women physicians
University of Geneva alumni
University of Oviedo alumni